"Party and Bullshit" is a song by the American hip hop artist The Notorious B.I.G., credited as BIG. It is his first single and was released as the fourth promotional single for the soundtrack to the 1993 film Who's the Man?.

Background
The refrain "party and bullshit" was inspired by the song "When the Revolution Comes" by the spoken word artists The Last Poets. Wallace changed the meaning in his rap. Abiodun Oyewole of The Last Poets explained, "When we rapped, it was all about raising consciousness and using language to challenge people. When I wrote [about] 'party and bullshit' it was to make people get off their ass. But now 'party and bullshit' was used by Biggie, used by Busta Rhymes, but in a non-conscious way." The song was performed at a concert with Biggie's friend-turned-rival Tupac in 1993.

Music video
The music video shows Biggie Smalls performing outdoors in Brooklyn, New York. Sean Combs and Lil Kim also appear in the video.

Remixes
"Party and Bullshit" was remixed by Ratatat on the 2007 album Ratatat Remixes Vol. 2, by the G-Unit rapper Lloyd Banks and appeared on his Halloween Havoc mixtape, by Hathbanger to the Miley Cyrus song "Party in the USA", to create "Miley Cyrous", by Shane Rutherfoord-Jones as a breakout single in 2011, titled "SRJ's Party and Bullshit remix" and by Solar Slim and Richie Branson in their Notorious B.I.G. and Star Wars mashup album Life After Death Star.

The official remix features Biggie's then-wife and widow Faith Evans.

Rita Ora's song "How We Do (Party)" interpolates the lyrics of "Party and Bullshit".

Track listing
12" vinyl
Side A
"Party and Bullshit" (Radio) - 3:42
"Party and Bullshit" (Album) - 3:42
"Party and Bullshit" (Instrumental) - 3:42
Side B
"Party and Bullshit" (Club Dirty) - 3:42
"Party and Bullshit" (Dirty Instrumental) - 3:42

Personnel
Adapted from Discogs.
Buttnaked Tim Dawg – co-producer
James Earl Jones, Jr. – co-producer
Sean "Puffy" Combs – executive producer
Andre Harrell – executive producer
Mark Siegal – executive producer
Toby Emmerich – music supervisor
Kathy Nelson  – music supervisor
Easy Mo Bee –  producer
Jonnie “Most” Davis - recording/mix engineer

References

1993 debut singles
The Notorious B.I.G. songs
Song recordings produced by Easy Mo Bee
Songs written by the Notorious B.I.G.
1992 songs
Uptown Records singles
Songs written by Easy Mo Bee